Micraglossa scoparialis is a moth in the family Crambidae. It was described by Warren in 1891. It is found in China (Shaanxi, Sichuan, Xizang, Hubei, Guizhou, Yunnan), Pakistan, Nepal and Vietnam.

The length of the forewings is 5–6 mm for males and 5–7 mm for females. The ground colour of the forewings is pale golden, suffused with black. The basal area is mostly black. The postmedian line has a golden spot at the costa. The subterminal line forms an X-shape together with the postmedian line.

References

Moths described in 1891
Scopariinae